This is a list of Carolina Panthers players who were elected to the Pro Bowl, the annual all-star game of the NFL. Pro Bowl rosters are determined by a combination of fan, player, and coach voting. In 2015, the Panthers had a franchise record 10 players selected to the Pro Bowl.

The year indicates the season for which the player was elected, not the year in which the game was played.

List of players

References 

 
Lists of Pro Bowl selections by National Football League team